Cidaris mabahissae is a species of sea urchins of the Family Cidaridae. Their armour is covered with spines. Cidaris mabahissae was first scientifically described in 1939 by Ole Mortensen.

See also 

 Cidaris abyssicola
 Cidaris blakei
 Cidaris nuda

References 

Animals described in 1939
Cidaridae
Taxa named by Ole Theodor Jensen Mortensen